Alebtong, is a town in the  Northern Region of Uganda. It is the chief municipal, administrative, and commercial centre of Alebtong District. The district is named after the town.

Location
Alebtong lies on the main road between the city of Lira, in Lira District to the west, and the town of Omoro, in Alebtong District to the east.

The geographical coordinates of Alebtong Town Council are: 2°15'00.0"N, 33°18'54.0"E (Latitude:2.2500; Longitude:33.3150).

Population

In 2015, Uganda Bureau of Statistics (UBOS) estimated the population of the town at 6,900. In 2020, UBOS estimated the mid-year population of Alebtong Town Council at 7,900 inhabitants; of whom 4,000 (50.6 percent) were females and 3,900 (49.4 percent) were males. UBOS calculated that between 2015 and 2020, the population of Alebtong Town Council increased at an average rate of 2.7 percent annually.

Points of interest
The following points of interest lie within the town limits or close to the edges of the town: (a) the offices of Alebtong Town Council (b) the headquarters of Alebtong District Administration (c) Alebtong Central Market, the source of daily fresh produce (d) Alebtong Health Center IV, a public health unit administered by the Uganda Ministry of Health and (e) Lira-Omoro Road, passing through Alebtong in a northwest to southeast direction.

See also
Langi people
List of cities and towns in Uganda

References

External links
  Alebtong Rising In cleanliness

Alebtong District
Populated places in Northern Region, Uganda
Cities in the Great Rift Valley
Lango sub-region